National Information Technology Agency (NITA) is a public service institution established by Act 771 in 2008 as the ICT policy implementing arm of the Ministry of Communications of the Republic of Ghana. NITA is the agency responsible for implementing Ghana's IT policies.

NITA

Its mandate includes identifying, promoting and developing innovative technologies, standards, guidelines and practices among government agencies and local governments, as well as ensuring the sustainable growth of ICT via research & development planning and technology acquisition strategies to facilitate Ghana's prospect of becoming a technology-driven, knowledge-and values-based economy as espoused in the e-Ghana project which ideally seeks to assist the Government generate growth and employment, by leveraging ICT and public-private partnerships.

e-Ghana project
The establishment of the National Information Technology Agency is essential for e-Government to take off in Ghana. E-Government, being an essential component of the e-Ghana project will contribute to improved efficiency, transparency and accountability in selected Government functions.

Objectivity
The objects of NITA are to:
 Regulate the provision of information communications technology.
 Ensure the provision of quality information communications technology.
 Promote standards of efficiency.
 Ensure high quality of service

See also
Ghana Open Data Initiative
Ghana Government Online Services Portal - eServices
Ghana Government Payment Portal

References

External links 
 Official website

Scientific organisations based in Ghana
Organizations established in 2008